Henry Johnson (fl. 1730) was an Irish pirate active in the Caribbean. He shared captaincy with a Spaniard, Pedro Poleas. Johnson was best known thanks to an autobiography written by a sailor he captured and marooned.

History

Johnson and Poleas jointly commanded the Rhode Island-built 18-gun, 90-man sloop Two Brothers.  He was known as a ruthless and bloodthirsty pirate, said to be an excellent shot despite missing a hand: “though he has but one hand, he fires a piece very dexterously, laying the barrel upon his stump, and drawing the trigger with his right hand.” He was also said to keep loaded pistols with him, even when he slept, in case of surprise attack or to take his own life if capture was imminent. Johnson was Irish but was called “Henriques the Englishman” by his majority-Spanish crew.

In early 1730 he attacked the 18-gun, 25-man John and Anne near Jamaica. The two vessels fought a five-hour running battle before the John and Anne surrendered. Johnson's pirates boarded and looted the John and Anne, threatening to hang its crew for daring to resist. Johnson forced his crew to stand down, and they agreed to maroon several of the prisoners instead. Johnson also intervened when Poleas tried to rape the pregnant wife of the ship's doctor, who had been killed in the fighting. Despite his fearsome reputation, he gave her back her clothes and belongings and promised her protection.

The incident was recorded by John Cockburn, a passenger on the John and Anne who was marooned by Johnson's pirates. The pirates’ gunner was marooned along with them for arguing over spoils; together he and Cockburn swam to a pirate camp on the mainland to ask for help. Cockburn did not know what became of Johnson, Poleas, the John and Anne, the woman, or the rest of the crew, though he records that Johnson was a wanted man throughout the American colonies. Cockburn's autobiography "The Unfortunate Englishmen" told the story of his marooning, escape, and two-year-long overland journey starting with his capture by Johnson.

See also
Richard Noland and Don Benito – another English and Spanish pair who co-captained a pirate vessel.
Richard Hancock and Augustin Blanco – another English and Spanish pair who co-captained a pirate vessel.

Further reading
Full text of John Cockburn's "The Unfortunate Englishmen" at the Internet Archive.

Notes

References

18th-century pirates
Year of birth missing
Year of death missing
Irish pirates
Caribbean pirates